Don Barry may refer to:

 Don "Red" Barry (1912–1980), American film and television actor
 Don Barry (Canadian football) (1931–2014), Canadian football player